Aradhona  (English: The Worship) is a 1979 Bangladeshi film starring Kabari, Bulbul Ahmed and Sharmili Ahmed. Abdus Sabur garnered a Bangladesh National Film Award for Best Art Direction.

Cast 
 Sharmili Ahmed
 Bulbul Ahmed
 Kabari

Track listing 
The music was composed by Alam Khan and written by Mukul Chowdhury. The songs were sang by Shammi Akhtar, Sabina Yasmin, Khurshid Alam and Indramohan Rajbongshi.

Awards 
Bangladesh National Film Awards
Best Art Director - Abdus Sobur

References

1979 films
Bengali-language Bangladeshi films
Films scored by Alam Khan
1970s Bengali-language films